Charles H. Smith (June 1, 1863 – November 4, 1915) was an American farmer and politician.

Born in the town of Green Lake, Green Lake County, Wisconsin, Smith went to Berlin High School in Berlin, Wisconsin and the Oshkosh Commercial College. Smith was a farmer. He served on the Green Lake Town Board and as the Green Lake Town Treasurer. Smith also served on the Markesan, Wisconsin Village Board. He served on the Markesan School Board and was the board clerk. In 1903. Smith served in the Wisconsin State Assembly and was a Democrat. From 1905 to 1909, Smith served in the Wisconsin State Senate. Smith died of cancer at the hospital in Fond du Lac, Wisconsin. He was buried in Markesan.

Notes

1863 births
1915 deaths
People from Green Lake, Wisconsin
Farmers from Wisconsin
Wisconsin city council members
School board members in Wisconsin
Democratic Party members of the Wisconsin State Assembly
Democratic Party Wisconsin state senators
Burials in Wisconsin
People from Markesan, Wisconsin